Bank Sepah (Bānke Sepah), the first Iranian bank, was established in 1925 (corresponding to 1304 in the Iranian Calendar). Its first branch, in Tehran, opened that year.
The bank also has branches in Frankfurt, Paris and Rome as well as a subsidiary, Bank Sepah International plc, in London.  Sepah Bank has recently merged 4 other Iranian banks and 1 Credit 
Institution named: Ansar Bank, Mehr Eghtesad Bank, Hekmat Iranian Bank, Ghavamin Bank and Kosar Credit Institution.

History 
Bank Sepah was officially founded on May 4, 1925, with its first branch in Sepah st. in Tehran. Initially, an investment of 3,883,950 Iranian Rials was made from the military ranked personnel pension fund and the bank was set to exclusively provide military personnel with financial aids such as loans. With further increase in their domain of services, the headquarters for the bank was moved to a larger building in Homayoon st. Starting on March 15, 1926, with opening of another branch in Rasht, Bank Sepah began providing services not only to the military personnel but to the more general public such as businessmen.
Sepah migrated to core banking solution.

US, UN sanctions

Sanctions were imposed on Bank Sepah by the United States on January 9, 2007, due to Iran's suspected nuclear weapons program. The United States claimed that the bank assisted Iran in developing missiles that could carry nuclear weapons. and all its branches and subsidiaries in Italy, UK, France and Germany will have their assets frozen by the United States in order to prevent Iran from constructing nuclear weapons. The official website of Bank Sepah in Iran reacted by mentioning the American resolution "fabricated statements based on purely hypothetical pretext, made out of political inducements" and promised that the bank will "continue with its efficient performance with due observance of internal and international regulations as before."

On the same basis, further sanctions have also been imposed by the United Nations through Resolution 1747 of 29 March 2007 coinciding with the arrest by the Iranian Government of some British army personnel in the Persian Gulf.

In early 2016, following  the talks of P5+1 with Iran on the Nuclear program of Iran, and the resultant Joint Comprehensive Plan of Action, sanctions against Bank Sepah were lifted.

Bank Sepah Coin Museum
Bank Sepah Coin Museum was established in 1963 and features a collection reflecting the periods of Iranian history dating back to over 2,500 years ago. The museum is also of international significance given the multiethnic nature of the Iranian ruling elites over time.

See also
Banking and Insurance in Iran

References

External links

Banks of Iran
Banks established in 1925
Iranian entities subject to the U.S. Department of the Treasury sanctions